is a former Japanese football player.

Playing career
Yoshida was born in Nagasaki Prefecture on November 25, 1969. After graduating from Kokushikan University, he joined Yamaha Motors (later Júbilo Iwata) in 1992. He played many matches as offensive midfielder from first season. However his opportunity to play decreased behind Gerald Vanenburg from 1994. From 1995, he played for Fukuoka Blux (1995), Consadole Sapporo (1996) and Blaze Kumamoto (1996). However he could hardly play in the match. In 1997, he moved to Honda. He played many matches in 2 seasons and he retired end of 1997 season.

Club statistics

References

External links

1969 births
Living people
Kokushikan University alumni
Association football people from Nagasaki Prefecture
Japanese footballers
J1 League players
Japan Football League (1992–1998) players
Júbilo Iwata players
Avispa Fukuoka players
Hokkaido Consadole Sapporo players
Honda FC players
Association football midfielders